Hands Off Me! is a 1937 Italian "white-telephones" comedy film directed by Gero Zambuto.

The film is notable for being the screen début of Totò. Its most famous scenes include one in which he tries to give a haircut to a bald man; another one where he fishes from the fishmonger's counter (this scene was repeated in Cops and Robbers and Toto in Paris) and also the scene in which he holds a broom, using it as a gun (shooting in "Figaro here, Figaro there").  The scene involving the conductor was also repeated in many subsequent films.

It was shot at the Safa Palatino Studios in Rome.

Plot 
In his first story, Totò plays the poor wanderer who meets up with a gentleman in poor economic conditions. The two try to earn a living as best they can, but they always incur misfortune and hatred because of their ineptitude. After being kicked out of a beauty salon because he was disguised as a nurse, Totò makes a bet between nobles and later wins a competition and a lot of money after replacing a famous conductor who was sick. Here Totò will show his theatrical flair performing in the famous gag of "Uncoordinated muppet". After having won the satisfactory sum, Totò will also discover to be of a noble family.

Cast

Totò: Count Totò di Torretota
Tina Pica: Giulia
Franco Coop: Vincenzino
Oreste Bilancia: Cavalier Gerolamo Battaglia
Cesare Polacco: Capomastro  
Guglielmo Sinaz: il capo cameriere
Miranda Bonansea: Bambina

References

Bibliography
 Moliterno, Gino. Historical Dictionary of Italian Cinema. Scarecrow Press, 2008; /.

External links
 

1937 films
1937 comedy films
1930s Italian-language films
Italian black-and-white films
Italian comedy films
Films directed by Gero Zambuto
Films shot at Palatino Studios
1930s Italian films